Fletikumab (NNC0109-0012) (INN) is a monoclonal antibody designed for the treatment of rheumatoid arthritis that targets IL-20.

This drug was being developed by Novo Nordisk A/S until Novo ceased work in inflammation.

References 

Monoclonal antibodies